Coindre Hall, originally called West Neck Farm, is a 40-room,  mansion in the style of a medieval French château completed in 1912 for pharmaceutical magnate George McKesson Brown.

History

George McKesson Brown
The house was designed by New York architect Clarence Sumner Luce and completed in 1912 for George McKesson Brown of the McKesson pharmaceutical family. Brown, a Huntington Fire Commissioner for 29 years before his retirement in 1960, was the elder half-brother of race car driver David Bruce-Brown. In 1930, Brown donated a private road to the Town of Huntington, named Browns Road in his honor. Brown sold the house in 1939. (He died at Huntington on October 3, 1964, age 86 years.)

Brothers of the Sacred Heart
In 1939, at the request of Bishop Monsignor Thomas Molly, the Brothers of the Sacred Heart (active in Christian education since 1847) bought the property, intending to establish a boarding school and summer retreat. It was founded by Brother Martinian, S.C., Provincial Superior and named in memory of Father André Coindre, the founder of the order. The school was intended to generate funds for the formation and education of young members of the order. It closed on June 30, 1971, due to a lack of teachers. At the time of its closing there were 116 students.

Suffolk County Ownership
The Suffolk County Legislature voted to purchase Coindre Hall for $750,000 in July 1972 and spent $4,000 to map the area. The plan was to use it as a harborfront park and lease the manor to the Town of Huntington to be used as a cultural center.

At the end of 1976, Suffolk County decided to close Coindre Hall due to budget cutbacks. It was costing the county about $90,000 to keep it open. Since the county's purchase of the property it had been used by the Huntington Militia, the Suffolk County Highway Patrol Bureau and the Huntington Art League.

The property was leased from Suffolk County in 1981 by Eagle Hill School, a private coeducational boarding school for students with learning disabilities. The school signed a 25year lease but run into financial difficulties and broke the lease in 1989. The school had declining enrollment and could not afford the rent or make needed repairs to the building.

Today
Since 1973, Coindre Hall Park has been administered by the Suffolk County Department of Parks, Recreation & Conservation. Currently there is a gym that hosts soccer and basketball, and [www.splashesofhope.org Splashes of Hope] has art studio space upstairs through a work-exchange program with the county.

The mansion is often used for hosting weddings and unique catered events exclusively through Lessings Caterers. The Town of Huntington Department of Parks & Recreation used Coindre Hall for its adult exercise classes in Fall 2018.

On September 26, 1985, it was listed on the National Register of Historic Places and dedicated to the Suffolk County Historic Trust.

References

External links
Coindre Hall Topographic Map
Coindre Hall Aerial Photo
Coindre Hall, Suffolk County Parks
Coindre Hall Alumni Facebook Page
Coindre Hall School Memorial Page
Brothers of the Sacred Heart
Brothers of the Sacred Heart Foundation

Boarding schools in New York (state)
Defunct schools in New York (state)
Educational institutions established in 1939
Houses on the National Register of Historic Places in New York (state)
Mansions of Gold Coast, Long Island
Huntington, New York
Houses in Suffolk County, New York
1939 establishments in New York (state)
Châteauesque architecture in the United States
National Register of Historic Places in Suffolk County, New York